Richard Edgcumbe, 1st Baron Edgcumbe,  (23 April 168022 November 1758) of Mount Edgcumbe in Cornwall, was an English Whig politician who sat in the English and British House of Commons from 1701 until 1742 when he was raised to the peerage as Baron Edgcumbe. He is memorialised by Edgecombe County, North Carolina.

Origins
He was the son of Sir Richard Edgcumbe and Lady Anne Montagu, daughter of Edward Montagu, 1st Earl of Sandwich.

Career
In 1694, at the age of 14, Edgcumbe succeeded his brother, Piers Edgcumbe, in the family estates. He was admitted at Trinity College, Cambridge in 1697 and travelled abroad in 1699.

Edgcumbe was returned unopposed as MP for Cornwall at a by-election on 25 June 1701 but never took his seat as Parliament had been prorogued. At the general election later in 1701, he was returned unopposed as MP for St Germans. Edgcumbe was elected MP for Plympton Erle at the 1702 English general election, probably on the Treby interest. He was re-elected at the 1705 English general election in a contest, and voted for the Court candidate as Speaker on 25 October 1705. Edgcumbe was returned as a Whig at the 1708 British general election, and was several times a teller for the Whigs. Although absent from the vote on the impeachment of Dr Sacheverell, he was attacked by the mob supporting Dr Sacheverell in Cornwall. Edgcumbe was returned again at the 1710 British general election but his behaviour in parliament appears contradictory. He was however to be one of the leaders of the great Whig procession through the City of London, which was banned by the government. Edgcumbe voted for the motion ‘No Peace Without Spain’ on 7 December 1712 and divided against the French commerce bill on 18 June 1713. He was returned again at the 1713 British general election, and voted against the expulsion of Richard Steele.

At the 1715 British general election, Edgecombe was returned unopposed as MP for Plympton Erle. He was appointed lord of the treasury in 1716. Edgcumbe surrendered the post when he went into opposition with Walpole in 1717, but was re-instated in 1720. He was returned again for Plympton Erle at the 1722 British general election. Edgcumbe held his post at the Treasury until 1724 when he was appointed Vice-Treasurer of Ireland, a post he held until 1742. He was returned again at the 1727 British general election, and was appointed a Privy Councillor for Ireland on 28 November 1727. At the 1734 British general election, Edgcumbe was returned as MP for Plympton Erle and Lostwithiel and chose to sit for Lostwithiel. He was Lord Warden of the Stannaries from 1734 to 1747. Edgcumbe was elected again for Plympton Erle at the 1741 general election and sat until he was raised to the peerage in 1742 and vacated his seat in the House of Commons. Edgcumbe was a faithful follower of Sir Robert Walpole, in whose interests he managed the elections for the Cornish boroughs, and his elevation to the peerage was designed to prevent him from giving evidence about Walpole's expenditure of the secret service money. In 1742, Edgcumbe was appointed Lord Lieutenant of Cornwall and Chancellor of the Duchy of Lancaster, which posts he held for the rest of his life. He became a colonel of a regiment of foot in 1745 and became major-general in 1755. He was appointed Chief Justice in Eyre, north of Trent in January 1758.

Marriage and children
Edgcumbe married Matilda Furnese (d.1721), a daughter of Sir Henry Furnese, 1st Baronet (c.1658-1712), of Waldershare in Kent, by whom he had four children, including:
Henry Edgcumbe, eldest son, died in infancy,
Richard Edgcumbe, 2nd Baron Edgcumbe (1716–1761) eldest surviving son and heir, who died unmarried;
George Edgcumbe, 1st Earl of Mount Edgcumbe, 3rd Baron Edgcumbe (1720–1795), who succeeded his brother and was created Earl of Mount Edgcumbe in 1789.

Notes

References

|-

|-

External links
http://www.twickenham-museum.org.uk/detail.php?aid=233&ctid=1&cid=17

1680 births
1758 deaths
People from Maker, Cornwall
Alumni of Trinity College, Cambridge
Barons Edgcumbe
Peers of Great Britain created by George II
Chancellors of the Duchy of Lancaster
Politicians from Cornwall
Lord-Lieutenants of Cornwall
Members of the Parliament of Great Britain for English constituencies
Members of the pre-1707 English Parliament for constituencies in Cornwall
Members of the Parliament of Great Britain for constituencies in Cornwall
Whig (British political party) MPs
Members of the Privy Council of Great Britain
Members of the Privy Council of Ireland
English MPs 1701
English MPs 1701–1702
English MPs 1702–1705
English MPs 1705–1707
British MPs 1707–1708
British MPs 1708–1710
British MPs 1710–1713
British MPs 1713–1715
British MPs 1715–1722
British MPs 1722–1727
British MPs 1727–1734
British MPs 1734–1741
British MPs 1741–1747
Members of the Parliament of Great Britain by political party